The following is a list of notable people born in or associated with the French city of Grenoble, Isère.

Grenoblois natives
The city was the birthplace of the following people.
 Abel Servien, marquis de Sablé et de Boisdauphin (1593–1659) a French diplomat.
 Antoine Marini (15th century), theologian, political thinker and diplomat, adviser to King George Podiebrad of Bohemia
 Hugues de Lionne (1611–1671) a French statesman.
 Claudine Françoise Mignot (1624–1711) a French adventuress. commonly called "Marie".
 Pierre Guérin de Tencin (1679–1758), French ecclesiastic, archbishop of Embrun and Lyon and a cardinal.
 Claudine Guérin de Tencin (1682–1749) a French salonist and author. 
 François-Emmanuel Guignard, comte de Saint-Priest (1735–1821), a politician and diplomat.
 Francis Regis Clet (1748–1820), martyr saint of China
 Jacques de Vaucanson (1709–1782), inventor of the automated loom and an automaton known as the Digesting Duck
 Jacques Rochette de La Morlière (1719–1785), 18th-century French playwright and writer.
 Étienne Bonnot de Condillac (1715–1780), writer of the Enlightenment.
 Joseph-Gaspard Dubois-Fontanelle (1727–1812), journalist and playwright 
 Claude Périer (1742–1801), public figure of the French Revolution and French Directory, banker
 Pierre Joseph Joubert de La Salette (1743–1833), General, musicologist
 Jean Joseph Mounier (1758–1806), politician.
 Antoine Barnave (1761–1793), orator of the French Revolution.
 Camille Teisseire (1764–1842), industrialist and public figure of the French Revolution
 Rose Philippine Duchesne (1769–1852), religious sister, educator and saint of the Catholic Church
 Casimir Pierre Périer (1777–1832), statesman.
 Stendhal (1783–1842), real name Marie-Henri Beyle, author.
 Antoine Clot (1793–1868) a French doctor known as Clot Bey while practicing in Egypt.
 Léon Roches (1809–1901), diplomat
 Henri Fantin-Latour (1836–1904), painter.
 Charles Bertier (1860–1924), landscape painter
 Philibert Guinier (1876–1962), botanist
 Pierre Cot (1895–1977), anti-fascist politician 
 Lionel Terray (1921–1965), climber
 Michel Calonne (born 1927), writer
 Ultra Violet (1935–2014), artist, author and former colleague of the American artist Andy Warhol
 Johnny Servoz-Gavin (1942–2006), motor-racing driver
 Michel Lotito (1950–2007), entertainer
 Maurice Dantec (born 1959), science-fiction author
 Sami Bouajila (born 1966), actor
 Christophe Aribert (born 1971), chef; holds two Michelin stars and four toques Gault Millau
 Seyhan Kurt (born 1971), poet and writer
 Fabrice Bellard (born 1972), computer programmer and author of FFmpeg
 Miss Kittin (real name Caroline Hervé; born 1973), electronica-music singer
 Vincent Clerc (born 1981), professional rugby union player (wing position)
 Pierre-Jean Croset (born 1949), composer and musicologist
 Olivier Giroud (born 1986), former Grenoble Foot 38 footballer, who now plays for Italian Serie A  side Milan
 Mister V (born 1993), YouTuber, Internet personality, comedian, rapper, and actor

Grenoblois residents
The following people have resided in Grenoble.

(sorted by year of birth)

 Pierre Terrail, seigneur de Bayard (1473–1524) a French knight and military leader.
 François de Bonne, duc de Lesdiguières (1543–1626)lieutenant-general of Dauphiné.
 Jean-Jacques Rousseau (1712–1778)philosopher and writer.
 Jean-François Champollion (1790–1832)Egyptologist.
 Joseph Fourier (1768–1830)mathematician and physicist.
 Louis Néel (1904–2000)physicist
 Pierre Mendès France (1907–1982)French prime minister
 Jean-Luc Godard (born 1930)film director
 Youri Djorkaeff (born 1968)association footballer; member of winning Team France at the 1998 FIFA World Cup and at the UEFA Euro 2000 
 Cristobal Huet (born 1975)professional ice hockey goaltender (Chicago Blackhawks)
 Katsuni (born 1979)professional pornographic actress; studied at the Grenoble Institute of Political Studies
 Julien Brellier (born 1982)association footballer; former team member of Heart of Midlothian F.C.

References

See also

List of French people

Grenoble